Luxembourg competed at the 2009 World Championships in Athletics from 15–23 August in Berlin, entering only one athlete into the competition: 800 metres runner Mike Schumacher.

Team selection

Track and road events

Results

References

External links
Official competition website

Nations at the 2009 World Championships in Athletics
World Championships in Athletics
Luxembourg at the World Championships in Athletics